This is a list of 80 genera in Xystodesmidae, a family of flat-backed millipedes in the order Polydesmida.

Xystodesmidae genera

 Anombrocheir Buckett & Gardner, 1969 i c g
 Apheloria Chamberlin, 1921 i c g b
 Boraria Chamberlin, 1943 i c g b
 Brachoria Chamberlin, 1939 i c g b  (Appalachian mimic millipedes)
 Brevigonus Shelley, 1980 i c g
 Caralinda Hoffman, 1978 i c g
 Cheiropus Loomis, 1944 i
 Cherokia Chamberlin, 1949 i c g b
 Chonaphe Cook, 1904 i c g b
 Cibularia  c g
 Cleptoria Chamberlin, 1939 i c g
 Croatania Shelley, 1977 i c g
 Cruzodesmus  c g
 Cyphonaria  c g
 Deltotaria Causey, 1942 i c g
 Devillea  c g
 Dicellarius Chamberlin, 1920 i c g b
 Dixioria Chamberlin, 1947 i c g
 Dynoria Chamberlin, 1939 i c g
 Epeloria  c g
 Erdelyia Hoffman, 1962 i c g
 Ezaria  c g
 Ezodesmus  c g
 Falloria Hoffman, 1948 i c g
 Fontaria  c g
 Furcillaria Shelley, 1981 i c g b
 Gonoessa Shelley, 1984 i c g
 Grayaria  c g
 Gyalostethus Hoffman, 1965 i c g
 Harpaphe Cook, 1904 i c g b
 Isaphe Cook, 1904 i c g
 Japonaria  c g
 Kiulinga  c g
 Koreoaria  c g
 Levizonus  c g
 Lourdesia Shelley, 1991 i c g
 Lyrranea Hoffman, 1963 i c g
 Macellolophus  c g
 Melaphe  c g
 Metaxycheir Buckett & Gardner, 1969 i c g
 Mimuloria  c g b
 Montaphe Chamberlin, 1949 i c g b
 Motyxia Chamberlin, 1941 i c g b
 Nannaria Chamberlin, 1918 i c g b
 Nikkonus  c g
 Ochridaphe  c g
 Ochthocelata Shelley, 1995 i c g
 Oenomaea Hoffman, 1964 i c g
 Orophe Chamberlin, 1951 i c g
 Oxyurus  c g
 Pachydesmus Cook, 1895 i c g b
 Paimokia  c g
 Parafontaria  c g
 Parariukiaria  g
 Parcipromus Shelley, 1995 i c g
 Parvulodesmus Shelley, 1983 i c g
 Phrurodesmus  c g
 Pleuroloma Rafinesque, 1820 i c g b
 Prionogonus Shelley, 1982 i c g
 Profontaria  c g
 Rhysodesmus Cook, 1895 i c g b
 Rhysolus  c g
 Riukiaria  c g
 Rudiloria Causey, 1955 i c g
 Selenocheir Shelley, 1994 i c g b
 Semionellus Chamberlin, 1920 i c g b
 Sigmocheir Chamberlin, 1951 i c g b
 Sigmoria Chamberlin, 1939 i c g b
 Sinoria  c g
 Stelgipus Loomis, 1944 i c g
 Stenodesmus DeSaussure, 1859 i c g
 Takakuwaia  c g
 Thrinaphe  c g
 Thrinaxoria Chamberlin & Hoffman, 1950 i c g b
 Tubaphe Causey, 1954 i c g
 Wamokia Chamberlin, 1941 i c g b
 Xystocheir Cook, 1904 i c g b
 Xystodesmus  c g
 Yaetakaria  c g
 Zinaria  c g

Data sources: i = ITIS, c = Catalogue of Life, g = GBIF, b = Bugguide.net

References

Xystodesmidae